The United States Soccer Federation submitted a bid with the hope of hosting the 2022 FIFA World Cup. U.S. Soccer first said in February 2007 that it would put forth a bid for the 2018 World Cup. On January 28, 2009, U.S. Soccer announced that it would submit bids for both the 2018 and 2022 Cups. In October 2010 it withdrew from the 2018 bid process to focus on winning the 2022 edition.  On December 2, 2010, it was announced that Qatar would be the host of the 2022 FIFA World Cup.

David Downs, president of Univision Sports, was executive director of the bid. The United States previously hosted the FIFA World Cup in 1994, as well as the FIFA Women's World Cup in 1999 and 2003.

Schedule

Bid committee

The American bid was being organized by USA Bid Committee, Inc.

The executive director of the bid was David Downs, CEO of Univision sports. Other members include U.S. Soccer President Sunil Gulati, Major League Soccer Commissioner Don Garber, Phil Murphy, the former national finance chair for the Democratic National Committee, former U.S. Secretary of State Dr. Henry Kissinger, New York City mayor Michael Bloomberg, California Governor Arnold Schwarzenegger, Clinton adviser Douglas Band, film director Spike Lee, former boxer Oscar De La Hoya, and Washington Post.

Details of the bid

In April 2009, the U.S. identified 70 stadia in 50 communities as possible venues for the tournament, with 58 confirming their interest. The list of stadia was trimmed two months later to 38 existing venues, one scheduled for completion in 2010, and one proposed venue.  On August 20, 2009, the list was further trimmed down to 32 stadia in 27 cities. On January 12, 2010, the USA Bid Committee narrowed the 27 cities down to 18 as the official host cities for the United States' Bid for the 2018 or 2022 World Cup.

Those 18 cities were: Atlanta, Baltimore, Boston, Dallas, Denver, Houston, Indianapolis, Kansas City, Los Angeles, Miami, Nashville, New York City, Philadelphia, Phoenix, San Diego, Seattle, Tampa and Washington, D.C. The 18 stadia selected host NFL or NCAA American football games, with a capacity over 65,000 spectators. No soccer-specific stadium was selected, since none in the country has capacity for more than 30,000 spectators.

Candidate venues

 † – American football team.
 Although sponsored stadium names are listed in this article, they were not used in the actual bid documents, and would not be used during the World Cup. FIFA controls all naming rights related to the World Cup, and generally prohibits the use of such names. Even stadiums that bear the names of FIFA sponsors are subject to this restriction—the venue then known commercially as Coca-Cola Park in Johannesburg was known by its non-commercial name of Ellis Park Stadium during the 2010 World Cup, even though The Coca-Cola Company is one of FIFA's main sponsors.
 Capacities listed are estimated capacity for the FIFA World Cup.

Rejected venues
The following venues were considered as possible candidate venues but were not chosen to be included in the final bid.

August 2009 cut
The following stadia were eliminated in an earlier cut in August 2009

June 2009 cut
The following stadia were eliminated in an earlier cut in June 2009

Denied interest in hosting
Sanford Stadium, Athens, Georgia; 1996 Summer Olympics soccer venue
Jordan–Hare Stadium, Auburn, Alabama
Darrell K Royal – Texas Memorial Stadium, Austin, Texas
Tiger Stadium, Baton Rouge, Louisiana
Lane Stadium, Blacksburg, Virginia
Kyle Field, College Station, Texas
Spartan Stadium, East Lansing, Michigan
Memorial Stadium, Lincoln, Nebraska
LaVell Edwards Stadium, Provo, Utah
Notre Dame Stadium, South Bend, Indiana
Beaver Stadium, State College, Pennsylvania
Bryant–Denny Stadium, Tuscaloosa, Alabama

Official bid partners
 Fox Soccer Channel
 AT&T
 American Airlines
 The Walt Disney Company 
 Chevron Corporation 
 Kohl's
 Subway Restaurants

Notes and references

External links
 US Soccer
 Official bid site

2022 FIFA World Cup bids
FIFA World Cup
Bid